The Jahrhundertring (Centenary Ring) was the production of Richard Wagner's Ring Cycle, Der Ring des Nibelungen, at the Bayreuth Festival in 1976, celebrating the centenary of both the festival and the first performance of the complete cycle. The festival was directed by Wolfgang Wagner and the production was created by the French team of conductor Pierre Boulez, stage director Patrice Chéreau, stage designer Richard Peduzzi, costume designer Jacques Schmidt and lighting designer André Diot. The cycle was shown first in 1976, then in the following years until 1980. It was filmed for television in 1979 and 1980. While the first performance caused "a near-riot" for its brash modernity, the staging established a standard, termed Regietheater (director's theater), for later productions.

Centenary 

Festival director Wolfgang Wagner selected the composer Pierre Boulez as the conductor for the centenary celebration of Wagner's most complex work, which had been first performed at the first Bayreuth festival. The conductor's first choice for a stage director was Ingmar Bergman. When he refused, Boulez recommended as stage director Patrice Chéreau. Chéreau brought in the team of stage designer Richard Peduzzi, costume designer Jacques Schmidt and lighting designer André Diot, with whom he had collaborated already in his first theatre, the Public-Theatre in the Parisian suburb of Sartrouville, from 1966.

The French team revolutionised the understanding of Wagner in Germany, as music critic Eleonore Büning wrote in the Frankfurter Allgemeine Zeitung. Unprecedentedly, the scene was set in the Industrial Revolution, "dressing the gods as capitalists at war with the Nibelung proletariat". Set at the time of the composition, it took a critical view of the time's capitalism, industrialism and spiritual background. The Rhinemaidens appeared as 19th-century cancan dancers and Wotan as a banker in a frock coat. Siegfried enters the hall of the Gibichungs dressed in the "ragged clothes of a mythical hero" and meets Gunther wearing a dinner jacket, visualising how alien the hero is to the world. The director's approach was described as a mix of "a vague sense of 19th-century melodrama with Shaw's messianic socialism and Strindberg's psychodrama.

Singers 

The singers for the production had to act as much as to sing, especially for the filming in 1980.

The following table shows singers from the first year 1976 to the last year, when it was filmed. The parts of Wagner's stage work are abbreviated R for Das Rheingold, W for Die Walküre, S for Siegfried, G for Götterdämmerung.

Alternate singers were in 1976 Hans Sotin as Wotan and Karl Ridderbusch as Hunding, Roberta Knie as Brünnhilde in Götterdämmerung and Bengt Rundgren as Hagen. In 1977, Patrice Chéreau acted the part of Siegfried in one performance of Siegfried, because singer René Kollo had broken his leg. In 1978, Astrid Schirmer performed Sieglinde in Walküre, Jean Cox sang the part of Siegfried in one performance of Siegfried.

Reception 

The Ring production was initially met with controversial reactions, provoking "a near-riot", due to its controversial setting of the saga in the Industrial revolution, with the Rhinemaidens as prostitutes. Later it was understood as "a thoughtful allegory of man's exploitation of natural resources". Winifred Wagner, the then elderly matriarch of the Wagner dynasty, disliked the production but asked rhetorically "isn't it better to be furious than to be bored?". After its final performance in 1980 the production was celebrated in a 45-minute standing ovation. It set a standard for productions of the Ring Cycle to follow. Called the beginning of Regietheater (director's theater), the production influenced directors and designers.

The production was filmed for television in 1979 and 1980. Die Walküre was shown in the ARD on 28 August 1980. The cycle was shown completely in 1983, in commemoration of the composer's death, and also presented in the cinema internationally.

While a DVD review of the BBC criticized Boulez's "ruthless tempi" and "pervasive lack of expressiveness", James Leonard noted: "... more controversial than Chéreau's dramatic conception was Boulez's musical execution. With startlingly clear textures, spectacularly bright colors, and stunningly light tempos, Boulez obtains a Wagner sound like no other. And for those with ears to hear, it works. Wagner's music doesn't have to be murky to be metaphysical or massive to be overwhelmingly moving and Boulez gets playing from the too-often turgid Bayreuth Festival Orchestra that makes the music crackle and blaze with musical and dramatic meaning." Edward Rothstein wrote for the New York Times: "Aspects of the score emerge with unexpected clarity. In the opening of 'Die Walküre', he deliberately understates the bass line, giving the music's aggressive restlessness an eerie disembodied character. Throughout 'The Ring', filigree and details are crisply articulated without undue stress on the leitmotifs; nothing is made sentimental or obvious. Particularly drawn to the intricately shifting sound world of the late, last opera, Mr. Boulez gives it a dramatic sweep along with a crystalline gleam."

References

Literature

External links 

  
 
 
 
 
 
 
 
 
 

Pierre Boulez
Bayreuth Festival
1976 in music
1976 in West Germany
Der Ring des Nibelungen
Stage productions of plays